Sembungan is a village in Kejajar district, Wonosobo Regency in Central Java province, Indonesia. Its population is 1215.

Climate
Sembungan has a subtropical highland climate (Cwb) with heavy to very heavy rainfall from October to May and moderate to little rainfall from June to September.

References

 Populated places in Central Java